Children of the Age is a 1915 film directed by Yevgeni Bauer.

Plot 

The film tells about a successful banker who falls in love with Maria Nikolaevna, the wife of one of his employees, and she in turn is tempted by the wealth of the banker.

Film crew 
Director: Evgeny Bauer

Cameraman: Boris Zavelev

Producer: Alexander Khanzhonkov

Starring 
 Arseny Bibikov as Lebedev
 V. Glinskaya as Lidija Verkhonskaja
 Ivan Gorsky as Maria's husband
 Vera Kholodnaya as Maria
 S. Rassatov as Bank Director
 A. Sotnikov as Lobovich

References

External links 
 

1915 films
1910s Russian-language films
Russian silent films
Russian black-and-white films
Films of the Russian Empire